Soufiane Chakkouche is a Moroccan Canadian writer and journalist. He is most noted for his novel Zahra, which was shortlisted for the Trillium Book Award for French Prose and the Prix Alain-Thomas in 2022.

He previously published the novels L’inspecteur Dalil à Casablanca and L’inspecteur Dalil à Paris. 

He resides in Toronto, Ontario, where he works as a Queen's Park political reporter for TFO.

References

1977 births
Living people
21st-century Canadian journalists
21st-century Canadian male writers
21st-century Canadian novelists
21st-century Moroccan writers
Canadian male novelists
Canadian television reporters and correspondents
Canadian novelists in French
Moroccan male writers
Moroccan novelists
Moroccan emigrants to Canada
People from Casablanca
Writers from Toronto